The Flynn Farm, Mansion, and Barn, also known as the Flynn Farm, Walnut Hill Farm, Clive Honor Farm, comprise a historic district located near Des Moines, Iowa, United States.  It was listed on the National Register of Historic Places in 1973.

Farm
The farm was originally  and grew to be .

It includes the original brick farmhouse and barn. Martin Flynn bought the land in 1867. Flynn was a livestock judge, cattle breeder, businessman, and railroad contractor. He was prominent from 1870 to 1906. From 1914 to 1967 the farm was owned by the state of Iowa and was part of the Clive Honor Prison Farm. After that, it became part of an agricultural museum, Living History Farms.

Flynn Mansion
The house was built from 1867 to 1871 in the Italianate style for Martin and Ellen Flynn.  They named their home Walnut Hill. The two-story brick house was built for $20,000. It has a hipped roof, cupola, wide bracketed eaves, narrow double-paned windows with hoods, a porch, and heavily molded double doors. Originally, the exterior was not painted.  There is a small wing on the back of the house with a side porch and simple roof brackets. A pre-cast cement addition was built onto the rear wing in the 19th century.  The mansion sits on top a hill that overlooks the surrounding farmland and a stream.

Barn
The gable-roofed barn that was built by Flynn has board-and-batten siding, a cupola for ventilation, numerous small window openings, and a large main door.  The large structure provided shelter, grain and hay storage, and space for equipment for the large number of horses that were needed on the farm.

References

Houses completed in 1871
National Register of Historic Places in Polk County, Iowa
Houses on the National Register of Historic Places in Iowa
Farms on the National Register of Historic Places in Iowa
Barns on the National Register of Historic Places in Iowa
Italianate architecture in Iowa
Historic districts in Polk County, Iowa
Tourist attractions in Polk County, Iowa
Houses in Polk County, Iowa
Historic districts on the National Register of Historic Places in Iowa